Gholami may refer to:

People
 Majid Gholami, Iranian footballer
 Mohammad Gholami, Iranian footballer

Places
 Gholami, Iran, a village in Mazandaran Province, Iran